Olga Romanovskaya, also known as Olga Koryahina; born January 22, 1986, in Mykolaiv, Mykolaiv Oblast, Ukrainian SSRm is a Ukrainian singer, television presenter, fashion designer and model.

Biography
As a student living in Mykolaiv, in 2006, Romanovska moved into the third year under the direction of the national university of Kyiv Culture and Art in the faculty of arts and crafts. She participated in exhibitions and photo shoots as a model to pay forher studies. In early 2006, the Nu Virgos group attended the funeral of Nadia Meiher who refused to participate further in the project. To replace her, a casting was organised at the wake and Koryahina decided to enter. To her surprise, she was chosen, but the vacant seat was taken by Khrystyna Kots-Hotlibm elected Miss Kyiv in 2003. After three months, the producers decided that it was not appropriate and they decided to give a chance to Romanovskaya. It formally integrated the group on April 10, 2006. Romanovskaya

became popular as a new soloist in the group.

In March 2007, Romanovskaya announced her pregnancy and left the group. Her last appearance was on April 16. At the end of April that same year, she married the Ukrainian businessman Andriy Romanovskyi and at the beginning of September, she gave birth to a boy, named Max.

On 25 February 2022, Romanovskaya was arrested in Moscow after taking part in a protest against the 2022 Russian invasion of Ukraine.

Discography 
Album with Nu Virgos
 L.M.L. (2006)

Singles with Nu Virgos
 2006 — "Л.М.Л."
 2006 — "Цветок и нож"

Solo career
 2007 — "Колыбельная"
 2013 — Тайная любовь"
 2013 — "Достучаться до неба"
 2015 — "Держи меня крепче"
 2016 — "Мало Малины" (feat. Dan Balan)
 2017 — "Папайя"

Clip with Nu Virgos

Solo clips

Actress

References

External links
 Official site
 Olga Romanovska on Facebook

1986 births
Living people
Ukrainian women singers
Nu Virgos members
Russian television presenters
Russian women singers
Russian women television presenters